Shesh Debanlu (also Romanized as Shesh Debānlū; also known as Shesh) is a village in Bibi Sakineh Rural District, in the Central District of Malard County, Tehran Province, Iran. At the 2006 census, its population was 523, in 128 families.

References 

Populated places in Malard County